Ta Phraya is the northeasternmost district (amphoe) of Sa Kaeo province, eastern Thailand.

History
The area was originally dense forest in Aranyaprathet district. Later people moved to there for agricultural work. When the community grew bigger, the government created the Ta Phraya minor district (king amphoe) in 1959. It was upgraded to a full district in 1963. This district gives its name to Ta Phraya National Park.

Kho Khlan Subdistrict in Ta Phraya district was the site of the Khao-I-Dang Cambodian refugee camp opened in the late 1970s during the Cambodian–Vietnamese War.

Geography
Neighboring districts are (from the south clockwise), Khok Sung and Watthana Nakhon of Sa Kaeo Province, Non Din Daeng and Lahan Sai of Buriram province. To the east is Banteay Meanchey Province of Cambodia.

The Sankamphaeng Range mountainous area is in the northern section of this district.

Administration
The district is divided into five sub-districts (tambons), which are further subdivided into 61 villages (mubans). Ta Phraya is a township (thesaban tambon) and covers parts of the tambon Ta Phraya. There are a further five tambon administrative organizations (TAO).

Missing numbers are tambon which now form Khok Sung District.

References

External links
amphoe.com
Ta Phraya National Park

Ta Phraya